SprintAir S.A. is a Polish airline headquartered in Warsaw and based at Warsaw Frederic Chopin Airport. It operates cargo services and passenger charter flights.

History
The airline was set up in 2002 under the name of Air Polonia Cargo Sp. z o.o. It started freight and mail flights in April 2004, with three Let L-410 UVP-E aircraft. Later that year the airline was renamed to Sky Express Sp. z o.o. and acquired its first Saab 340A turboprops (SP-KPF and SP-KPE - first Saabs340 to be entered into the Polish Aircraft Register). Between April 2006 and April 2007 it started scheduled domestic passenger operations under the Direct Fly brand. After the suspension of regular passenger flights, the airline has been continuing freight operations while extending its fleet of turboprop aircraft that is currently made up of 12 Saabs 340 and 6 ATRs 72 (which SprintAir has been acquiring gradually since 2014).  In January 2008 SprintAir Group was established and the airline changed its name to SprintAir.

In the summer of 2011, SprintAir operated charter flights from several Polish airports to holiday destinations (mainly in the Mediterranean region) using a single leased Airbus A320 aircraft. This activity was suspended with the end of summer 2011 season and has not been continued.

SprintAir is now mainly an air cargo company performing both scheduled and ad hoc operations around Europe. Scheduled passenger services which previously were operated within Poland are no longer offered.

Destinations

SprintAir serves scheduled cargo flights to the following destinations:

Poland
 Bydgoszcz - Bydgoszcz Ignacy Jan Paderewski Airport
 Gdańsk - Gdańsk Lech Wałęsa Airport
 Katowice - Katowice International Airport
 Kraków - John Paul II International Airport Kraków-Balice
 Poznań - Poznań-Ławica Airport
 Rzeszów - Rzeszów-Jasionka Airport
 Warsaw - Warsaw Chopin Airport Base
 Wrocław - Copernicus Airport Wrocław

Lithuania
 Kaunas - Kaunas Airport

Latvia
 Riga - Riga International Airport

Ukraine
 Kyiv - Kyiv International Airport (Zhuliany)

Fleet
As of June 2018, the SprintAir fleet comprises the following aircraft:

References

External links 

 

Polish companies established in 2008
Airlines of Poland
Airlines established in 2008
Companies based in Warsaw
Polish brands